The Sidney Hollander Award is an award for work towards obtaining equal rights for African Americans, given by the Sidney Hollander Foundation, in Baltimore, Maryland, USA, and named in honor of Sidney Hollander.

The Sidney Hollander Foundation
In December 1941, a foundation was set up in order to honor Sidney Hollander. Hollander was an influential humanitarian living in Baltimore, Maryland during the mid-20th century. Being a humanitarian, Hollander was an avid believer that all people should be afforded justice, civil rights, and equal opportunity for education, employment and housing. African Americans, especially, should be treated in the same way as any other American. Hollander wanted to create a place to live where everybody would be treated equally.

The Sidney Hollander Award

The Sidney Hollander Foundation created the Sidney Hollander Award after World War II. This award was given to a person who had worked diligently towards obtaining equal rights for African Americans in Maryland. Segregation was a huge issue that both African Americans and whites were forced to deal with during this time period. While African Americans had gained many rights, including the right to vote, they were still treated very unfairly. They were forced to use different entrances to stores, different bathrooms, and many were not given proper job opportunities in fields in which they were well qualified.

However, Sidney Hollander saw this and knew it was wrong. As a result, his family set up an award to give to any person who had helped to erase any signs of segregation in Maryland and help to achieve equal rights for all citizens of the United States. This award was handed out every year for about sixteen years (1947 – around 1964). Many recipients include organizations such as the Sun Paper, the Baltimore City Medical Society, and Loyola College. These organizations all helped to spread the word that African Americans should be treated as equal human beings in Maryland. While several awards went to organizations, there were also a few that went to individuals. These individuals include Robert Freedman, Theodore R. McKeldin and Thomas J. S. Waxter. These men were very important men in Maryland during this time period and they were all dedicated to desegregation in the state.

In 1964, the foundation realized that the government, religious organizations, and political parties were all dealing with the issue of desegregation in Maryland. Finally the issue of desegregation was seen on a higher level that could hopefully help to get it resolved. The Sidney Hollander Foundation announced that the award given the previous year would be the last. In the approximate sixteen years in which the award was handed out, many important advances were made in ending segregation in Maryland. Many people believe the Hollander Award was responsible for many of the acts of desegregation because it helped to show people what was being done in Maryland to help end segregation.

Sidney Hollander 

Sidney Hollander (1881–1972) was a Baltimore, Maryland, businessman who devoted time and resources to advocacy and social action in the fields of civil rights, social welfare and social reform. He served numerous private and public philanthropic organizations as an officer and board member and gained prominence in both local and national forums as a social activist and reformer, principally from 1938 to 1971.

References 

Awards established in 1947
Humanitarian and service awards
1947 establishments in Maryland
History of African-American civil rights